Manzoor Hussain Mirza (13 August 1930 – 28 March 2016) was a Pakistani educationist who also was an Additional Secretary of Education, and Professor of Economics.

He authored many books on English and economics, as well as writing several book reviews.

Early life and education
Born and raised in Bhimber, Azad Jammu and Kashmir, he passed matriculation exam after attending Bhimber High School. Manzoor Mirza graduated with honours in English Literature from Murray College Sialkot and went to University of the Punjab Lahore for his master's degree in Economics. He received his master's degree in 1952.

Career
After finishing his college education, he started teaching Economics as a lecturer. Then he became the founding principal of Government College for Boys in Phalia, Mandi Bahauddin District, Punjab (Pakistan). For some time, he served as a director of colleges, Multan Division. Later, he was sent on deputation to a university in Kampala, Uganda as associate professor of Economics. In 1989, he represented Pakistan in a South Asian Association for Regional Cooperation (SAARC) conference held in India.

He also served as a panelist at the Civil Services Academy Lahore in Punjab, Pakistan as well as a guest speaker at National Institute of Public Administration (NIPA).

Newspaper columnist
Manzoor Hussain Mirza was a regular newspaper columnist at many English-language newspapers in Pakistan until 2001.

Books and Contributions
 Selective Long Essays
 Sundry Reflections
 Paragraphs and Essays
 Special Reflective Essays
 Text Book of Development Economics
 Writing Practice for IELTS Test
 Pool of Topics
 Writing Topics for TOFEL and other Competitive Exams

Death
Manzoor Mirza died peacefully on 28 March 2016 at the age of 85 in Lahore, Pakistan. The funeral prayers of Manzoor Mirza were offered in Masjid (mosque) near his residence and was buried in Johar Town Graveyard in Lahore.

References

1930 births
2016 deaths
Pakistani educational theorists
Pakistani columnists
Pakistani economists